District Munsiff Court (alternate spelling District Munsif Court) is the court of the lowest order handling matters pertaining to civil matters in the district, a legal system followed in the Indian subcontinent. Usually, it is controlled by the District Courts of the respective district. The District Munsif Court is authorised to try matters pertaining to certain pecuniary limits. The State Government notifies the pecuniary limits for the District Munsiff Courts. It is under the charge of a munsiff magistrate/judicial collector.

The appeal against these courts lies before the Subordinate Courts which are one rank superior to the District Munsiff Courts but are inferior to the District court. The State Government  prescribes the territorial jurisdiction of the District Munsiff Court. The district is further divided into subdivisions; each subdivision has an in-charge tax inspector and Registrar magistrate.  The munsiff magistrate is the judge and presiding officer of the District who keep charge of all tax inspectors (tehsildars). Enforcement is of the law of 1982 CrPc.

See also
 District Courts of India
 Judicial Magistrate's Court
India

Law of India
District Courts of India